Saad Al-Selouli (born 25 May 1998) is a Saudi professional footballer who currently plays as a midfielder for Abha.

Career
On 5 July 2022, Al-Selouli joined Abha on a two-year deal.

References

 

1998 births
Living people
People from Dammam
Association football wingers
Saudi Arabian footballers
Saudi Arabia youth international footballers
Ettifaq FC players
Abha Club players
Saudi Professional League players
Footballers at the 2018 Asian Games
Asian Games competitors for Saudi Arabia
21st-century Saudi Arabian people
20th-century Saudi Arabian people